This list is about Hammarby IF players with 50 to 99 league appearances. For players with at least 100 appearances, see List of Hammarby Fotboll players. For a list of all Hammarby IF players with a Wikipedia article, see :Category:Hammarby Fotboll players. For the current Hammarby IF first-team squad, see First-team squad.

Hammarby IF Fotbollförening, commonly known as Hammarby Fotboll, is a Swedish professional football club founded in 1915 and based in Stockholm. The club is affiliated with Stockholms Fotbollförbund (The Stockholm Football Association), and plays its home games at Tele2 Arena. 

The club is placed 12th in the all-time Allsvenskan table, the Swedish first league, and has won the domestic championship title once, in 2001.

Key

General
League appearances and goals are for first-team competitive league matches only, including Allsvenskan, Svenska Serien, Superettan, Division 1, Division 2, Division 3 and Division 4 matches. Qualification and play-off matches are included, as well as substitute appearances.
Players are listed according to the total number of league games played, the player with the most goals scored is ranked higher if two or more players are tied.

Table headers
 Nationality – If a player played international football, the country/countries he played for are shown. Otherwise, the player's nationality is given as their country of birth.
 Hammarby Fotboll career – The year of the player's first appearance for Hammarby Fotboll to the year of his last appearance.
 League appearances – The number of games played in league competition.
 League goals – The number of goals scored in league competition.

Players

Appearances
Statistics correct as of match played 9 February 2021.

75+ appearances

50+ appearances

Footnotes

References

List
Players
Hammarby IF
Association football player non-biographical articles